Harry Louis Kirsch (October 17, 1887 – December 25, 1925), nicknamed "Casey", was a Major League Baseball pitcher who played for one season. He pitched in two games for the Cleveland Naps during the 1910 Cleveland Naps season.

External links

1887 births
1925 deaths
Cleveland Naps players
Major League Baseball pitchers
Baseball players from Pennsylvania
Akron Champs players
East Liverpool Potters (baseball) players